Shield lichen is the common name for lichens in either the genus Heterodermia or genus Parmelia.

References 

Fungus common names
Lichenology